Ivan Vadimovich Smirnov (born 14 January 1999) is a Russian racing cyclist, who currently rides for UCI Continental team . He rode in the men's team pursuit event at the 2018 UCI Track Cycling World Championships.

Major results

Track

2016
 UEC European Junior Championships
2nd  Individual pursuit
3rd  Team pursuit
2017
 1st  Team pursuit, UCI World Junior Championships
 UEC European Junior Championships
1st  Team pursuit
1st  Individual pursuit
 2nd Team pursuit, National Championships
 UCI World Cup
3rd Team pursuit, Minsk
3rd Team pursuit, Pruszkow
2018
 National Championships
1st  Madison (with Aleksandr Smirnov)
1st  Team pursuit
 UEC European Under-23 Championships
2nd  Individual pursuit
3rd  Team pursuit
2019
 European Games
1st  Team pursuit
1st  Individual pursuit
 UEC European Under-23 Championships
1st  Team pursuit
2nd  Individual pursuit
 National Championships
1st  Team pursuit
2nd Madison
2nd Individual pursuit
2020
 UEC European Under-23 Championships
1st  Team pursuit
1st  Madison (with Lev Gonov)
2nd  Individual pursuit
3rd  Kilo
 National Championships
1st  Team pursuit
1st  Madison (with Lev Gonov)

Road
2017
 1st Stage 3a Trofeo Karlsberg
 3rd Overall Grand Prix Rüebliland
 7th Trofeo comune di Vertova
2020
 1st Grand Prix Mount Erciyes
 2nd Grand Prix Cappadocia
2021
 4th Circuito del Porto

References

External links
 

1999 births
Living people
Russian male cyclists
Place of birth missing (living people)
Cyclists at the 2019 European Games
European Games medalists in cycling
European Games gold medalists for Russia